The shiny miner bee (Andrena fulgida) is a species of miner bee in the family Andrenidae. It is found in North America.

References

Further reading

 
 

fulgida